The first war against Swietopelk II was a military conflict in Pomerelia and Kuyavia. It was fought between 1236 and 1238 by the Duchy of Lubiszewo, and later the Mecklenburgian forces, both led by Sambor II, the Duchy of Białogarda, led by Ratibor and the Duchy of Kuyavia, led by Casimir I, all fighting against Duchy of Gdańsk, led by Swietopelk II. The conflict ended with the conquest of Lubiszwo and Białogarda, and subsequent recovery of control over their rulers by Swietopelk II. Additionally, Kuyavia conquered neighboring lands of the Duchy of Gdańsk, and was subsequently raided by it, receiving heavy financial and material losses. Following the war, Swietopelk II was excommunicated by the Catholic Church.

War 
On 15 June 1236, Swietopelk announced to his brothers that he had designated his oldest son, Mestwin II, as his successor, as the duke of Pomerelia. This violated the agnatic seniority law, which stated that the eldest brother should be the successor. At the time, Sambor II, with the help of the Teutonic Order, had started fortifying in the settlement of Gorzędziej. That autumn, Swietopelk had attacked it, defeating Sambor's forces and conquering the Duchy of Lubiszewo. After the fight, he spared the life of his brother Sambor, exiling him. Additionally, Swietopelk II formed an alliance with Sambians, Natangians and Warmians.

Sambor II aligned with the forces from Mecklenburg. Around 1237, Mecklenburgian fleet had begun fighting with Gdańsk forces alongside the Baltic Sea coast. Later on, crossing the Vistula river. In 1237 or at the beginning of 1238, Ratibor, fortified Białogarda, and, aided with troops of Kuyavian bishop, attacked the Schlawe and Stolp Land, which he subsequently conquered and plundered. At the same time Sambor II captured the settlement of Słońca. On 1 March 1238, Sambor II, together with Mecklenburgian troops, traveled to Białogarda, in order to pursue Ratibor, to unite in the war against Swietopelk II. Soon after, Swietopelk II defeated Sambor in the battle of Słońca, capturing him and keeping him captive until around 1239. Then, he attacked Białogarda, destroying the army of Ratibor, conquering his duchy, and burning its capital subsequently. Ratibor was also exiled to Kuyavia until 1239.

The Duchy of Kuyavia, led by Casimir I, attacked the Duchy of Gdańsk, conquering Bydgoszcz Castellany. On 11 June 1238, Swietopelk signed an agreement with the Teutonic Order, according to which he would not ally with Prussian tribes. In August 1238, Swietopelk organized a raid on the Duchy of Kuyavia, aimed against Casimir I and bishop Michał, as the response to the previous attack. During the attack, his army destroyed around 23 villages and the properties of bishops and monasteries, as well as devastating the town of Inowrocław, and stealing a massive amount of farm animals. 

Following the attack, Swietopelk was excommunicated from the Catholic Church. On 30 November 1238, Swietopek was put on the trial by Polish episcopal conference, against bishops of Kuyavia and Płock, Strzelno monastery and Gdańsk Dominicans, all of whom were victims of his raid. According to the trial verdict, he had to financially compensate the victims to end his excommunication. He never managed to fulfill it. In 1239, around the Easter, Swietopelk, had released Sambor II, and allowed Ratibor to come back from exile, returning their duchies to them. In return, both brothers had to pledge their allegiance to Gdańsk.

Notable battles 
 Battle of Słońca

See also 
 Second war against Swietopelk II
 Civil war in Pomerelia

Citations

References

Bibliography 
 
 
 

Wars of the Middle Ages
Wars involving Poland
History of Pomerania
History of Poland during the Piast dynasty
Conflicts in 1236
Conflicts in 1237
Conflicts in 1238
13th century in Poland